Bodhadi (BK) is a major village in Kinwat taluka of Nanded district in Indian state of Maharashtra.It is located 16 km away from Kinwat while 117 km from Nanded city. In 2011 village had population of 8,101 with literacy rate of 78% and average sex ratio of 992. Village has Primary Health Centre (PHC).

References

Villages in Nanded district